Leo Samoylovich Palatnik; (1909–1994) was an outstanding Ukrainian physicist known for his contributions in the field of thin film physics and film material.

External links
Leo Palatnik

20th-century Ukrainian physicists
National University of Kharkiv alumni
1909 births
1994 deaths
Laureates of the State Prize of Ukraine in Science and Technology